Zero Cuts is a Spanish eco-socialist and christian left party alliance, initially founded as a group of electors, formed to contest the 2014 European Parliament election. Subsequently, it has contested the 2015 and 2016 general elections together with The Greens–Green Group. It is supported by the Communist Unification of Spain.
In the 2019 Spanish general election, the filmmaker Fernando Colomo was the Madrid candidate to the Spanish Senate for the coalition Zero Cuts – Grupo Verde – Partido Castellano – Tierra Comunera.
His aim was to promote the list rather than becoming elected.

Electoral performance

Cortes Generales

European Parliament

References

Political party alliances in Spain